Ryazanovo is a rural locality (a village) in Demidovskoye Rural Settlement, Gus-Khrustalny District, Vladimir Oblast, Russia. The population was 3 as of 2010.

Geography 
Ryazanovo is located 53 km south of Gus-Khrustalny (the district's administrative centre) by road. Bobry is the nearest rural locality.

References 

Rural localities in Gus-Khrustalny District